Yi Fan may refer to:

Nancy Yi Fan (born 1993), writer
Hou Yifan (born 1994), chess player
Yi Fan (footballer) (born 1992), Chinese football player